Perplexicervix is a genus of bird appearing in the eleventh Mammal-Paleogene zone of Hessen, Germany.

References

Fossils of Germany
Neognathae
Eocene birds